This is a list of 18th-century British children's literature authors (arranged by year of birth):
 Isaac Watts (1674–1748) 
 Sarah Fielding (1710–1768)
 John Newbery (1713–1767)
 Christopher Smart (1722–1771) 
 Oliver Goldsmith (1728–1774)
 Dorothy Kilner (1735–1836)
 Sarah Trimmer (1741–1810)
 Anna Laetitia Barbauld (1743–1825)
 Ellenor Fenn (1743–1813)
 Hannah More (1745–1833)
 John Aikin (1747–1822)
 Thomas Day (1748–1789)
 Charlotte Smith (1749–1806)
 Mary Ann Kilner (1753–1831)
 Maria Elizabetha Jacson (1755–1829)
 Dorothy Kilner (1755–1836)
 Maria Edgeworth (1767–1849)
 Lucy Peacock (fl. 1775–1816)
 Charles Lamb (1775 – 1834)

References

 
British children's literature
British children's literature